Fabian Fuchs (born 20 December 1961) is a Swiss former professional racing cyclist. He rode in one edition of the Tour de France and three editions of the Giro d'Italia.

References

External links
 

1961 births
Living people
People from Lucerne-Land District
Swiss male cyclists
Sportspeople from the canton of Lucerne